Anderton Park Primary School is a coeducational primary school located in the Sparkhill area of Birmingham, West Midlands, England.

It is a community school administered by Birmingham City Council.

In 2019, it became the focus of campaigners opposed to LGBT representation in Sex and Relationship Education lessons. These campaigners mounted a sustained demonstration outside the gates of the school before being stopped by the High Court, as of 2021, the school still teaches materials containing references to LGBT groups.

The school is mentioned in official accounts relating to the so-called Trojan Horse scandal.

References

External links 
Anderton Park Primary School official website

Primary schools in Birmingham, West Midlands
Community schools in Birmingham, West Midlands
LGBT history in the United Kingdom